The Owl House is an American animated fantasy television series created by Dana Terrace that premiered on Disney Channel on January 10, 2020. The series stars the voices of Sarah-Nicole Robles, Wendie Malick, Alex Hirsch, Tati Gabrielle, Issac Ryan Brown, Mae Whitman, Cissy Jones, Zeno Robinson, Matthew Rhys, Michaela Dietz, Elizabeth Grullon, and Fryda Wolff.

In November 2019, ahead of the series premiere, the series was renewed for a second season, which premiered on June 12, 2021. In May 2021, ahead of the second season premiere, the series was renewed for a third season consisting of three specials, later announced to be the final season of the series, with Terrace later stating that this was because the series "did not fit the Disney brand". The first episode of the final season premiered on October 15, 2022, with the series finale set to air on April 8, 2023.

The Owl House has become particularly notable for its LGBTQIA+ representation compared to other Disney media, including becoming the first Disney property to feature a same-sex couple in leading roles, a same-sex kiss involving lead characters, and non-binary characters. The series also won an award for Children's & Youth Programming at the 2021 Peabody Awards.

Premise
The series centers on Luz Noceda, a teenage Dominican-American human girl who accidentally stumbles upon a portal to the Demon Realm, where she arrives at the Boiling Isles, an archipelago formed from the remains of a dead titan, and befriends the rebellious witch Eda Clawthorne, also known as "The Owl Lady", and her adorable demon housemate King. Despite not having magical abilities, Luz pursues her dream of becoming a witch by serving as Eda's apprentice at the Owl House and ultimately finds a new family in an unlikely setting.

In the second season, Luz attempts to return to the Human Realm, Eda tries to confront her curse, and King searches for the truth about his past while contending with the Boiling Isles' ruler, Emperor Belos, who is preparing for the mysterious "Day of Unity".

In the finale specials, Luz and her friends journey to save the Boiling Isles from Belos and the chaotic Collector.

Episodes

Cast

 Sarah-Nicole Robles as Luz Noceda
 Wendie Malick as Eda Clawthorne
 Alex Hirsch as King and Hooty
 Tati Gabrielle as Willow Park
 Issac Ryan Brown as Gus Porter
 Mae Whitman as Amity Blight
 Zeno Robinson as Hunter
 Matthew Rhys as Emperor Belos
 Cissy Jones as Lilith Clawthorne
 Michaela Dietz as Vee
 Elizabeth Grullon as Camila Noceda
 Fryda Wolff as The Collector

Production

Background

Dana Terrace first began conceiving early ideas for a series about a girl learning to be a witch in late 2016. While working on DuckTales, Terrace didn't feel "fulfilled artistically or emotionally", so she began to research influences and work from her college years, eventually rediscovering the works of artists such as Hieronymus Bosch and Remedios Varo, inspiring her to create a show for Disney that features strong surreal visual elements. Terrace initially pitched the idea to both Nickelodeon and Cartoon Network, but neither deal worked out.

In 2018, it was reported that Dana Terrace, previously a storyboard artist for Gravity Falls and later a director on the 2017 DuckTales reboot, was creating and executive-producing an animated series, titled The Owl House, for Disney Television Animation. The series was greenlit alongside Amphibia in 2018 with an order of 19 episodes, and was set originally for a 2019 release, but it was delayed to a 2020 release. Terrace would later call the decision to work with Disney as a fortuitous one stating, "I think it's important to note that Owl House would NOT be what it is if made at another studio," and cited the fact that having each episode be 22-minutes rather than 11 is one of the reasons why it worked out so well.

Terrace is the third woman to create a series for Disney Television Animation, after Pepper Ann with Sue Rose, and Star vs. the Forces of Evil with Daron Nefcy.

Development
Terrace said that the general lore for the series was inspired by art and storybooks by Hieronymus Bosch. According to Terrace, the hardest decision when creating the series was whether to implement potential lore elements in the series. Terrace also stated the lore of the series is "70 percent made up", with writers also drawing inspiration from books about witchcraft for spells and character names, to add depth to its lore. The Pokémon franchise served as a strong influence on the series.

Eda was the earliest character created for the show. Terrace said the character is inspired by "the women who raised me. My aunts, my Nana, and my mom, they're all in the Owl Lady". The second character created was King, who was described by Terrace as "a little guy that wants to be big", something she related to. Luz was the final main character created and was inspired by consultant and story artist Luz Batista. Batista agreed to let Terrace use her name for the series' main character on the condition that she be Dominican-American, which Terrace agreed to. The character's personality was inspired by "stories of each other about what dorks we were in high school", as well as parts from Terrace's childhood. Alex Hirsch, Terrace's partner and creator of the TV series Gravity Falls, on which Terrace served as a storyboard artist and revisionist, serves as a creative consultant on the series.

Several of the series' themes are inspired by Terrace's childhood. The series features themes of uniqueness and conformity, which were inspired by Terrace's experience at school, where she was mocked for her habit of drawing roadkill, only to meet people with similarly different personalities when she went to a new school. The series also explores the idea of getting close to fulfilling a dream, yet being unable to completely fulfill it, inspired by how Terrace was told that she wouldn't be a cartoonist, only to "[find her] own path".

Hirsch said that while there was a concern with the Disney Channel over the series' horror elements, Terrace nevertheless chooses to feature horror elements, arguing that "Disney is the full spectrum of emotions, creatures and scary things". Terrace said that Disney "allowed me to do more than I thought they would". Terrace also said that the producers "[don't] want to pull [their] punches on the show" in its horror elements, as she "loved being a little scared" as a child, though she also wanted to balance them with comedy and heartfelt moments. She described the magic elements on the show as "a framing device for the grounded emotional stories" featured in the series.

The series initially had a darker tone, as Terrace wanted to create a TV series targeted at older audiences "where things like whimsy and darkness can coexist", but had to tone it down during season 1 to find a compromise between her ideas and Disney executives' wishes, though she nevertheless was proud of the final product. The tone of Season 2 is closer to what Terrace originally intended.

Animation
The show is animated by Rough Draft Korea, Sunmin Image Pictures, and Sugarcube Animation. Terrace said that the visual style was inspired by paintings by Remedios Varo, John Bauer, and Hieronymus Bosch, as well as Russian architecture. By December 2019, the show had 120 people working on the show, including those in the animation studios, and 50 staffers on the pre-production crew.

Spencer Wan served as the animation supervisor during season one. Disney initially refused for the series to have an in-house animator, feeling Wan may not meet their "overseas pipeline", but he was eventually hired. Kofi Fiagome serves as animation supervisor for season two. Terrace also provided rough animation for three season 2 episodes.

Ricky Cometa served as the art director for the series. Cometa first became involved with the series when Terrace began working on the pilot, before the series was green-lighted by Disney, and was approached by Terrace, a fan and friend of Cometa's because she "really wanted to work with someone who I vibed with, someone whose style I knew, that could execute the kind of weird junk I wanted to do", and Cometa agreed to work on the series due to being interested in the concept. Cometa said that he wanted to "try and show the dualities between the Demon Realm and the human realm, and with a little twist of demons and eyeballs and bones and whatnot". He also didn't want all demons on the show to have scary appearances, as they are supposed to represent normal people within the show.

Terrace said that Luz's design was "challenging", as she struggled to create a design for Luz that didn't make her look too old or that felt too much like a costume. Cometa eventually created a t-shirt for Luz to wear that is "low key, and like a nod to all our fellow nerds out there". Cometa said that it was "fun" to design demonic versions of commonplaces. The animators also changed real-life elements to further distinguish the Boiling Isles from Earth, such as making the ocean purple.

On July 19, 2019, Terrace announced that TJ Hill composed the series' score. On January 10, 2020, Hill said that the score features "interesting and experimental sounds that [he] had a ton of fun cooking up". In the second season, Gravity Falls and Star vs. the Forces of Evil composer Brad Breeck took over as composer.

By March 2020, Disney Television Animation was closed in response to the COVID-19 pandemic, forcing the production crew to work on season 2 remotely from their homes.

Broadcast
On June 10, 2019, the trailer premiered during the show's Annecy 2019 panel. It was uploaded to Disney Channel's YouTube channel a day later.

The show's main title sequence was released on July 19, 2019, during San Diego Comic-Con 2019. The show released a sneak peek and an official end credit sequence on October 4, 2019, during a panel at New York Comic Con 2019. The show's main title sequence for season 2 was released on May 17, 2021. A trailer for season 2 was released on June 3, 2021.

Season 1 aired its 19th and final episode on August 29, 2020. On November 21, 2019, the series was renewed for a 21-episode second season prior to the first season's debut. On May 17, 2021, the series was renewed for a third season, which will consist of three 44-minute specials, ahead of the second season premiere. The episode order was much shorter than the 10–20 episodes that the production team was anticipating, only for Terrace to later confirm in a response to a fan's question that it would be the final season.

In October 2021, in an AMA on Reddit, Terrace explained the series was cut short not because of its ratings or the COVID-19 pandemic, but rather because executives at The Walt Disney Company believed that it did not fit "into the Disney brand." She stated that this was the case due to the serialized nature of the show and an audience that "skews older," rather than due to its LGBTQ+ representation, saying that she would not "assume bad faith" against those she works with in Burbank. Terrace also noted that due to the pandemic, budgets were constrained and episodes were cut, further adding that she was not allowed to present a case for a fourth season. However, Terrace said that she believed there was a future for the show if Disney Branded Television had "different people in charge."

When asked about the series' future on Twitter, Terrace expressed interest in continuing it in other media. This content could include comics and a limited series centering on Eda's past, as well as other potential spin-offs, though Terrace stated the three specials of season 3 were the end of the main story, persuading fans to ask Disney regarding more content based on the show.

On March 10, 2023, Terrance confirmed that production on the series is completed.

The Owl House had its first international debut in Canada on January 12, 2020, in Southeast Asia on March 20, 2020, in Turkey on April 6, 2020, in Latin America on April 13, 2020, in France on April 15, 2020, in South Korea on May 23, 2020, in Japan on July 23, 2020, in the UK & Ireland on August 10, 2020, in the Netherlands on August 24, 2020, in Spain on October 3, 2020, in Africa on October 26, 2020, in Romania and Bulgaria on January 2, 2021, in Poland on Disney XD on January 4, 2021, and in Scandinavia on February 15, 2021.

The entire first season was added to Disney+ in the United States on October 30, 2020. In the U.S., the first five episodes of the second season were added to Disney+ on July 21, 2021, while episodes six through ten were added on August 18.

The show was originally intended to premiere on January 2, 2021, on the local Disney Channel feed shared by Hungary and the Czech Republic, but it has not aired on the channel for unknown reasons. The series later premiered exclusively on Disney+ in those two countries on June 14, 2022.

LGBTQ+ representation

The Owl House has been praised for featuring several characters who are LGBTQ+, in particular the romance between the characters of Luz Noceda and Amity Blight. Series creator Dana Terrace first implied a romance between the two on July 7, 2020, when responding to a fan who posted a screenshot from the upcoming episode "Enchanting Grom Fright" on Twitter which showed Amity putting her hands on Luz's shoulders and looking into her eyes. Claiming "there is no heterosexual explanation" for Amity's action, Terrace responded, "there really isn't". On August 8, 2020, the episode, written by Molly Ostertag, aired, and it featured a scene in which Luz and Amity dance together while casting spells to defeat "Grom," a demon that manifests as their deepest fears. The animation supervisor for the show, Spencer Wan, referred to their intimate dance as "the gay thing" and the first time he got to "do anything even remotely queer."

On September 2, 2020, during a Reddit AMA, Dana Terrace confirmed that Amity intended to be a lesbian and that Luz is bisexual. The two girls represent Disney's second animated LGBTQ+ characters after Sheriff Blubs and Deputy Durland in Gravity Falls, and the first to be unambiguously portrayed as such. In the episode "Understanding Willow", one of the main characters (Willow Park) is shown to have two dads. Some noted that the beginning of the show's second season, which began airing in 2021, continued to build out the relationship between Amity and Luz, with Luz reciprocating Amity's feelings at the end of "Escaping Expulsion" and both blushing at each other. Others praised Amity's character evolving outside her "relationship with Luz."

The series was nominated for a GLAAD Media Award for Outstanding Kids and Family Programming in 2021 and won a Peabody Award for "...giving queer kids a welcome template...to explore their own budding creative energies."

On July 10, 2021, the episode "Through the Looking Glass Ruins" premiered, which focused heavily on Gus' development as a character and how much he's grown since his last major appearance. However, the episode received significant attention and press over Luz and Amity's growing relationship and its ending, in which Amity kisses Luz on the cheek. The episode "Eda's Requiem" features a character named Raine Whispers, who uses they/them pronouns and is voiced by transgender and non-binary actor Avi Roque. Raine is both Disney TVA's and Disney's first transgender and/or non-binary character. Roque said that the character is based on their own experience, with the character's skin color reflecting their actual skin color, praised the show as normalizing queer identity, and said it was an honor to voice Raine. In the episode, Eda Clawthorne is shown to have romantic feelings for Raine. The subsequent episode, "Knock, Knock, Knockin' on Hooty's Door", reveals that Eda and Raine were formerly dating, before breaking up due to Raine beginning work in the coven system. The episode also has Luz and Amity asking each other out and officially becoming a couple. GLAAD praised the episode, saying they were excited to see a "wonderful and affirming message" from the series. Jade King of TheGamer praised the series for having a fictional universe where queer characters can "learn to love themselves without the fear of ridicule", comparing it to the similar approaches in Steven Universe and She-Ra and the Princesses of Power, noting the relationship between Luz and Amity. In March 2022, Lilith, Eda's older sister, was confirmed to be aromantic and asexual during a charity Livestream, via an in-character letter read by the character's voice actress Cissy Jones. Jade King of TheGamer noted that Cissy Jones said that her letter during a charity stream saying that Lilith didn't have any romantic attractions was "basically canon", further confirming those identities. On May 21, 2022, the penultimate episode of season two "Clouds on the Horizon" aired, in which Luz and Amity share a kiss on the lips. A promotional video released on September 25, 2022, depicted Luz in a new outfit with a pin on her beanie, picturing the bisexual flag. On October 15, 2022, the first The Owl House special "Thanks to Them" has Luz come out to her mother as bisexual. The special also reveals that Vee's campmate Masha is non-binary as they use they/them pronouns in their nameplate and their nails are painted in the colors of the non-binary pride flag.

Reception

SVOD viewership 
According to Whip Media, The Owl House was the 8th top-rising show across all platforms, based on the week-over-week growth in episodes watched for a specific program, during the week of June 13, 2021. According to the streaming aggregator JustWatch, The Owl House was the 6th most watched television series across all platforms in the United States, during the week of October 10, 2022, to October 16, 2022.

Critical reception
The Owl House has received widespread critical acclaim. Emily Ashby of Common Sense Media rated the show 5 out of 5 stars and said putting different elements together made the series quirky and likable. It was also described as well-written and animated, and speculated that "[the show] likely will be one you will want to watch alongside your older kids and tweens, allowing you to discuss these kinds of themes as they come up." LaughingPlace.coms critic praised the series for its unique visuals and voice acting, stating "The performances fit together beautifully as the diversity in their delivery showcases the characters' unique roles in the Demon Realm." Colliders Dave Trumbore gave the series' first episode a 4-star rating, feeling that the episode "[has] got a dark, yet darkly comic edge to the whole thing." The conservative evangelical Christian religious television network Christian Broadcasting Network attacked the show, declaring it was part of a "witch agenda to make witchcraft look positive," an assessment that a writer for The Mary Sue called "hyperbolic," and stated that a "rebellious Latina witch" is, to those like CBN, "probably the scariest thing," while stating that the show sounds like "a ton of fun."

Kevin Johnson of The A.V. Club was critical of the series, stating that they were not "buying the developments between Amity and Luz," but praised Eda's character. Ben Bertoli wrote that Terrace and those working on the job had done a great job creating a fantasy world, and relatable characters, and predicted a "big animation fandom." Nick Venable wrote that fans of Gravity Falls and Steven Universe would love the series because the "otherworld-ness of the Boiling Isle[s] immediately asserts itself" while the show makes "relationships feel genuine and tactile," following in the footsteps of those shows. At the same time, Colin Hickson of Comic Book Resources praised the series, while noting that the opening of the series would give "any Gravity Falls fans a major sense of deja vu." Jade King of TheGamer described the show as a "groundbreaking queer adventure" that has broken boundaries in LGBTQ+ representation, noting how it builds off to She-Ra and the Princesses of Power and Steven Universe. King also said that the show could make sure "queer content isn't merely a footnote to the overall story" but ingrained into the show itself. In another review, King compared the series to Matt Braly's Amphibia, another Disney Channel animated series, noting their similar premise and characters, calling them "kindred spirits". Amy Mars of CBR noted that series such as Amphibia, Avatar: The Last Airbender, My Little Pony: Friendship Is Magic, She-Ra and the Princesses of Power, Teen Titans, Hilda, Star vs. the Forces of Evil, Castlevania, and Gravity Falls had some similarities with The Owl House. The first and second seasons currently hold a rating of 100% on Rotten Tomatoes.

Accolades

|-
! scope="row" rowspan="1" style="text-align:center;" | 2020
| Autostraddle TV Awards
| Outstanding Animated Series
| The Owl House
| 
| 
|-
! scope="row" rowspan="6" style="text-align:center;" | 2021
| GLAAD Media Award
| Outstanding Kids and Family Programming
| The Owl House
| 
|
|-
| Annie Awards
| Best Character Design
| Marina Gardner (for "Young Blood, Old Souls")
| 
|
|-
| Peabody Awards
| Children's & Youth Programming
|The Owl House (Shared with Stillwater)
| 
|
|-
| Daytime Emmys
| Outstanding Main Title for a Daytime Animated Program
|The Owl House
| 
|
|-
| Imagen Awards
| Best Voice-Over Actor – Television
| Sarah-Nicole Robles
| 
|
|-
| Autostraddle TV Awards
| Outstanding Animated Series
|The Owl House
| 
| 
|-
! scope="row" rowspan="6" style="text-align:center;"| 2022
| GLAAD Media Award
| Outstanding Kids and Family Programming
|The Owl House
| 
| 
|-
| BMI Film & TV Awards
| BMI Cable Television Awards
| TJ Hill
| 
| 
|-
| rowspan="2"|Autostraddle TV Awards
| Outstanding LGBTQ+ Director / Writer / Showrunner
| Dana Terrace
| 
| rowspan="2"| 
|-
| Outstanding Animated Series
| The Owl House
| 
|-
| rowspan="2"|Imagen Awards
| Best Voice-Over Actor (Television)
| Sarah-Nicole Robles
| 
| rowspan="2"|
|-
| Best Youth Programming
| The Owl House
| 
|-
! scope="row" rowspan="2" style="text-align:center;"| 2023
| Annie Awards
| Best TV/Media – Children
| "King's Tide"
| 
|
|-
| GLAAD Media Award
| Outstanding Kids and Family Programming - Animated 
| The Owl House
| 
|
|}

Cancelled novel
A light novel based on The Owl House was set to be released in May 2022. According to Dana Terrace, the novel was to feature an original story based on the in-universe fictional character "The Good Witch Azura". However, it was confirmed by Dana Terrace on March 25, 2022, in a now-deleted tweet, that the light novel had been cancelled due to financial disputes between the publisher and authors hired to write the book.

References

External links
 
 Production website
 

2020 animated television series debuts
2020s American animated television series
2020 American television series debuts
2020s American horror comedy television series
American children's animated adventure television series
American children's animated comedy television series
American children's animated fantasy television series
Dark fantasy television series
English-language television shows
Disney Channel original programming
Television series by Disney Television Animation
Television series set on fictional islands
Television shows set in Connecticut
Hispanic and Latino American television
Portal fantasy
Television series about witchcraft
Bisexuality-related television series
2020s American LGBT-related comedy television series
2020s American LGBT-related animated television series

American children's animated horror television series
Anime-influenced Western animated television series
LGBT speculative fiction television series
Peabody Award-winning television programs
Witch hunting in fiction